Karja is a village in Saaremaa Parish, Saare County in western Estonia.

Before the administrative reform in 2017, the village was in Leisi Parish.

German philologist Kurt Treu (1928–1991) was born in Karja.

References

Villages in Saare County